Egnell Creek is a tributary of the Hackett River in northwest part of the province of British Columbia, Canada. Mount Egnell is located near the creek's mouth, as is the historic locality known as Egnell or Sheslay, once a telegraph station on the Yukon Telegraph Line.

Egnell Creek's watershed's land cover is classified as 46.1% shrubland, 32.4% barren, 24.5% conifer forest, 12.8% mixed forest, and small amounts of other cover.

Egnell Creek is in the traditional territory of the Tlingit Taku River Tlingit First Nation and the Tahltan people.

Geography
The creek flows southwest through Level Mountain's high and relatively barren lava plateau. After about  Egnell Creek enters a steep canyon carved into the escarpment on Level Mountain's western side. Below the escarpment the landscape is dominated by coniferous forests.

History
Egnell Creek is named for Albert Egnell, a miner, fur trader, and Hudson's Bay Company (HBC) employee. In the 1880s Egnell was an employee of Rufus Sylvester, who had come to the region during the Omineca Gold Rush. At this time Egnell joined the HBC and managed Liard Post. During the 1890s Egnell conducted various operations in northwestern British Columbia, sometimes for the HBC, sometimes independently.

Albert Egnell was prospecting in the area near Egnell Creek in the 1880s. It was probably around this time that Egnell Creek and Mount Egnell were named. The HBC built a trading post sometime before 1898 near the mouth of Egnell Creek. This post, first known as Tackoo, then Egnell or Egnell Post, was abandoned by the HBC in the late 1890s. Subsequently, a number of buildings and a mission house were constructed and the name changed to Sheslay. This settlement has since been abandoned. Today the Yukon Telegraph Trail follows the historic route of the Yukon Telegraph Line.

After spending one winter at Egnell Post, Albert Egnell found that there was no trade to be done in the area and the post was subsequently abandoned. Egnell died on 22 June 1900, from an accidental gun shot to his leg five days earlier. He was buried at Liard Post.

In 1891–1892, the HBC constructed a trail from the mouth of Egnell Creek, near the junction of the Sheslay and Hackett rivers to the southwestern slope of Level Mountain.

See also
List of British Columbia rivers

References

External links
 

Cassiar Land District
Level Mountain
Nahlin Plateau
Rivers of British Columbia
Stikine Country
Tahltan
Tlingit